Théo Pierrot (born 1 January 1994) is a French professional footballer who plays as a midfielder for Belgian First Division B club Lommel.

Career
In 2015, Pierrot signed for Seraing in the Belgian Second Division from the reserve team of French Ligue 1 side Metz.

During his time with Seraing, Pierrot was part of a team rising from the third division to the top division of Belgian football, while becoming team captain.

On 31 January 2022, Pierrot moved to Lommel.

References

External links
 

1994 births
Living people
Sportspeople from Nancy, France
French footballers
Association football midfielders
FC Metz players
R.F.C. Seraing (1922) players
Lommel S.K. players
Championnat National 2 players
Championnat National 3 players
Belgian Pro League players
Challenger Pro League players
French expatriate footballers
Expatriate footballers in Belgium
French expatriate sportspeople in Belgium
Footballers from Grand Est